Abudulai Issaka (born 6 March 1982) is a former footballer who is last known to have played as a defender for Athlone Town. Bornand raised in Ghana, he played for the national team.

Career

Before the 2001 season, Issaka signed for Jokerit in Finland, before joining Dundalk.

In 2008, he signed for Kildare County in the Irish second division.

In 2013, he signed for Maltese side Qormi from Majees in Oman.

In 2014, Issaka signed for Luxembourgish second division team Sandweiler.

Before the second half of 2014/15, he signed for Turnhout in the Belgian fourth division.

References

External links
 

1982 births
Living people
People from Cape Coast
Equatoguinean footballers
Equatorial Guinea international footballers
Ghanaian footballers
Association football defenders
Oman Professional League players
FC Jokerit players
K.F.C. Diest players
Qormi F.C. players
Maltese Premier League players
Majees SC players
Kilkenny City A.F.C. players
US Sandweiler players
Veikkausliiga players
Athlone Town A.F.C. players
Kildare County F.C. players
KFC Turnhout players
St Patrick's Athletic F.C. players
Dundalk F.C. players
Ghanaian expatriate footballers
Expatriate association footballers in the Republic of Ireland
Ghanaian expatriate sportspeople in Finland
Expatriate footballers in Finland
Ghanaian expatriate sportspeople in Belgium
Expatriate footballers in Belgium
Ghanaian expatriate sportspeople in Oman
Expatriate footballers in Oman
Expatriate footballers in Luxembourg
Naturalized citizens of Equatorial Guinea